Ortholepis myricella is a moth of the family Pyralidae. It was described by James Halliday McDunnough in 1958. It is found in North America, including British Columbia, Maine, Manitoba, Michigan, Nova Scotia and Quebec.

The wingspan is about 15 mm. The forewings are largely deep smoky, with a distinct coppery tinge, especially in the apical area. There are two pale whitish areas. The hindwings are smoky ochreous, the marginal area narrowly darker.

References

Moths described in 1958
Phycitini